Events in the year 1913 in Spain.

Incumbents
Monarch: Alfonso XIII
President of the Government: Álvaro Figueroa Torres (until 27 October), Eduardo Dato (starting 27 October)

Deaths

October 29 - Darío de Regoyos. (born 1857)

References

 
Years of the 20th century in Spain
1910s in Spain
Spain
Spain